I'll Be There is a 2003 British-American comedy drama film directed and co-written by Craig Ferguson, who, in his directorial debut, also stars in the film with singer Charlotte Church in her film debut.

Plot
Olivia (Charlotte Church) is a young girl who is blessed with a beautiful, natural singing voice, although few people know that. She was conceived the night her mother met Paul, a Scottish rock star (Craig Ferguson), but the couple fell out of touch. Paul never knew that he had a daughter. Much later, Paul is "sectioned" after a motorcycle accident is viewed as a suicide attempt, and he meets his now 16-year-old daughter while confined to a psychiatric hospital.

Olivia's mother feels she was betrayed by Paul and failed by her own musician father, so she does not want her daughter to be involved in what she sees as the decadent world of rock music. In spite of her mother's attempts to keep them apart, Olivia and Paul get to know each other and they become the family they should have been all along.

Cast
Craig Ferguson as Paul Kerr
Charlotte Church as Olivia Edmonds
Jemma Redgrave as Rebecca Edmonds
Ralph Brown as Digger  
Ian McNeice as Graham
Imelda Staunton as Dr. Bridget
Anthony Head as Sam Gervasi (credited as Anthony Stewart Head)
Joss Ackland as Evil Edmonds - The BeeLzeeBOPS
Joseph Alessi as Enzo
Marion Bailey as Mary
Dominic Cooper as Boyfriend
Danny Webb as Denny Wise
Poppy Elliott as Girlfriend
Stephen Noonan as Gordano (as Steve Noonan)
Ravi Aujla as Dr. Nahar
Tom Ellis as Ivor
 Phyllida Law as Mrs. Williams

External links
 
 
 
 

2003 films
Morgan Creek Productions films
Warner Bros. films
2003 comedy-drama films
2003 directorial debut films
Films with screenplays by Craig Ferguson
Films scored by Trevor Jones
American comedy-drama films
British comedy-drama films
2000s English-language films
2000s American films
2000s British films